Yanaqucha (Quechua yana black, qucha lake, "black lake", hispanicized spelling Yana Cocha) is a mountain in the Andes of Peru, about  high. It is situated in the Cusco Region, Quispicanchi Province, on the border of the districts of Marcapata and Camanti. It lies northeast of Piki Mach'ay.

References 

Mountains of Cusco Region
Mountains of Peru
Lakes of Cusco Region
Lakes of Peru